Jakubów  is a village in the administrative district of Gmina Przysucha, within Przysucha County, Masovian Voivodeship, in east-central Poland.

Jakubów jest wioską w okręgu administracyjnym Gminy Przysucha w Polsce, Wieś położona jest w zachodnio-centralnej Polsce i leży 120 km od Warszawy, 40 km od Radomia.

References

Villages in Przysucha County